Seth Demonstration Forest is a state forest in the state of Maryland.

Maryland state forests
Protected areas of Talbot County, Maryland